"I Get the Bag" is a song by American rapper Gucci Mane featuring fellow American hip hop group Migos. It was released on August 18, 2017, as the third single from Mane's eleventh studio album Mr. Davis (2017). However, it excludes Migos member Offset, who was incarcerated at the time of the release of this song, leaving only Quavo and Takeoff in the song with Gucci Mane.

Background
"I Get the Bag" was first released as an instant grat track on August 18, 2017 for pre-orders of the album. It was then sent to urban radio on September 5, 2017, as the album's third single (second radio single).

Composition
"I Get the Bag" contains an interpolation of Migos' previous hit single "Slippery" featuring Gucci Mane.

Music video
The music video was released the same day the song was premiered. It has over 502 million views as of September 29, 2020 . The producer of the song, Metro Boomin made a cameo.

Commercial performance
"I Get the Bag" is Gucci Mane's highest charting single as a lead artist (tied with "Wake Up in the Sky" in 2018). It peaked at number 11 on the Billboard Hot 100, charting for 16 weeks. It also peaked at number one on the Mediabase Urban Airplay chart. It is Gucci Mane's highest certified single, with sales over 6 million units in the US.

Charts

Weekly charts

Year-end charts

Certifications

Release history

Notes

References

2017 songs
Gucci Mane songs
Migos songs
Songs written by Gucci Mane
Songs written by Metro Boomin
Song recordings produced by Metro Boomin
Songs written by Southside (record producer)
Songs written by Quavo
Songs written by Takeoff (rapper)
Song recordings produced by Southside (record producer)